Iven Austbø (born 22 February 1985)  is a Norwegian former professional footballer who played as a goalkeeper.

Career
Austbø began his senior career in Viking, where he got his debut on the top level in Norway in 2004. Austbø became Viking's first choice goalkeeper after Anthony Basso left the club in 2006, and remained the first choice for the rest of the season. When Viking brought Thomas Myhre home from Charlton in 2007, Austbø was put back on the bench. Wanting to play first team football, Austbø signed for Stabæk in 2008, but again found himself to be the second choice behind Jon Knudsen. He was sold to Sandefjord in 2011, where he was the club's first choice goalkeeper in Adeccoligaen for three seasons. After the 2013 season, he signed for Viking again. He retired after the 2021 season.

Career statistics

Club

Honours
 Viking
 Norwegian First Division: 2018
 Norwegian Football Cup: 2019

References

External links 
 
 
 Profile  for Viking FK

1985 births
Living people
Sportspeople from Stavanger
Norwegian footballers
Eliteserien players
Norwegian First Division players
Stabæk Fotball players
Viking FK players
Sandefjord Fotball players
Association football goalkeepers
Norway youth international footballers
Norway under-21 international footballers